Egg Fu is a fictional character appearing in DC Comics publications and related media, commonly as an adversary of the superhero Wonder Woman. Most frequently represented as an enormous sentient egg (and often, inexplicably, of Chinese descent), he was created by Robert Kanigher and Ross Andru in 1965's Wonder Woman #157. Over the years, multiple versions of the character have appeared with varying backstories and alternative names (including Egg Fu the Fifth, Chang Tzu, and Dr. Yes) to battle not only Wonder Woman, but also the Metal Men, Checkmate and Harley Quinn.

In early appearances, the character was a Yellow Peril ethnic stereotype, complete with caricatured Asian facial features and dialogue written in a phoneticized Chinese accent. Certain 21st century updates, such as changing his name to Chang Tzu and affiliating him with DC Comics' Chinese superhero team the Great Ten, maintain his Asian ethnicity while striving to de-emphasize his historically racialized characterization. Appearances in Harley Quinn in 2014 and Harley Quinn and Power Girl in 2015, though restoring the name Egg Fu, have expunged overt associations with Chinese culture and language.

Publication history 
Egg Fu was created by Robert Kanigher and Ross Andru. He debuts 1965's Wonder Woman #157, and dies in the same issue. One year later, Egg Fu the Fifth, a relative of the original Egg Fu, debuts in Wonder Woman #166 (November 1966). Soon after, Dr. Yes (a reference to Dr. No), Egg Fu's robot twin, appears in Metal Men #20 (June/July 1966).

Fictional character biography

Pre-crisis history

Original Egg Fu
Egg Fu is a Chinese Communist agent, perplexingly shaped like an egg the size of a house, with a Charlie Chan-like speech pattern, who uses his mustaches as whips against his enemies. In Egg Fu's first appearance, Steve Trevor is captured by the Chinese mastermind and turned into a human bomb. Egg Fu then launches Steve and a doomsday missile at the American fleet. Wonder Woman intercepts Steve, who has become a deadly menace. Unable to save him, she redirects his path into the enemy missile. The explosion destroys the missile, Steve, and Wonder Woman herself, but the fleet is saved. Informed of her daughter's demise, Queen Hippolyta gathers the remains of Wonder Woman and Steve Trevor and returns them to a laboratory on Paradise Island. Using an atomic structure reassembly beam, she restores Steve and her daughter. However, Steve's body is still infused with explosive energy. Wonder Woman finds that her own body has also become explosive, making them both a danger to the world. They leave Paradise Island. Wonder Woman plans to use the explosive power against Egg Fu. He sends his troops against her, but they fail in their task to overcome her. A piece of anti-matter removes the explosive matter from Steve and her, then the Amazon defeats Egg Fu.

Egg Fu the Fifth

Wonder Woman and Steve Trevor investigate the disappearance of an American submarine. While flying over the ocean where it disappeared, Wonder Woman's plane is fired upon by an enemy freighter. Steve boards the ship, then disappears too.

Wonder Woman's plane is drawn underwater into a giant seashell. Frogmen attack her and take her prisoner. She is brought to a secret base controlled by Egg Fu the Fifth, a relative of the original Egg Fu. Held prisoner by her own magic lasso, Wonder Woman offers to dance for Egg Fu. She then performs a bracelet-clashing dance which cracks Egg Fu and allows her to escape and rescue the stolen submarine.

Dr. Yes
Dr. Yes, Egg Fu's robot twin, uses a giant robot to capture Will Magnus, leader of the Metal Men. The team travel to Dr. Yes' base, where he brainwashes them, believing that "when the Ameicans see how these great heroes of theirs have turned traitors-- they will doubt anyone's strength to resist us!" [sic]

The giant robot takes the Metal Men to a football stadium that is celebrating "I am an American Day". Fighting the urge to say "Down with America!" in front of everyone, the Metal Men self-destruct instead. An angry Dr. Yes tries having the giant robot destroy the crowd instead, but the various pieces of the Metal Men attack and destroy the robot, freeing Magnus who had been trapped inside. Afterwards, Magnus rebuilds the superhero team. Dr. Yes is still at large at the story's end.

Post-crisis history

Post-crisis Egg Fu
Following the Crisis on Infinite Earths, a new version of Egg Fu is introduced in Wonder Woman (vol. 2) #128 (December 1997). This Egg Fu is a nineteenth-century super-computer, recently rediscovered and turned into one of many carnival attractions along Gateway City's Oceanside boardwalk, despite public protests that the attraction is racially insensitive.

Egg Fu is actually a product of Apokoliptian technology created from a device Scott Free accidentally left behind on a visit to Earth. Once activated, it begins dominating people's minds and preparing them for transport to Apokolips. Egg Fu is defeated by Hippolyta (at the time acting as Diana's successor as Wonder Woman), Donna Troy, Artemis and Wonder Girl. An associate of Mister Miracle, Metron, removes it.

Chang Tzu

Following the events of Infinite Crisis, a new version of Egg Fu appears, calling himself Chang Tzu (likely a reference to Chuang Tzu, or possibly Sun Tzu), an agent of Apokolips.

Chang Tzu (Chung Zhu) is the mastermind, along with Bruno "Ugly" Mannheim, behind the kidnappings of many mad scientists in the comic book series 52. They are forcibly recruited into Chang's "Science Squad" based on Oolong Island. Chang has a large, egg-shaped body with facial features and cracked skin, mounted in a spider-legged chair for mobility. He is equipped with small prosthetic hands that allow him to manipulate items and equipment; he is also armed with hidden weaponry.

Shortly after Black Adam escapes confinement on Oolong Island, Chang Tzu is shot apart by one of his kidnapped scientists, Dr. Will Magnus. Magnus claims to be acting irrationally due to a lack of medication. A new, smouldering egg was seen hidden in Chang's shattered remains. When he later reappears and is asked about his seeming destruction, he explains: "My third incubation ended four months ago".

Chang Tzu later re-appears as the main villain in 2007's "Checkout" storyline that crossed over between the Outsiders and Checkmate series. The UN-sponsored clandestine agency devoted to meta-human special operations capture the then-wanted super-hero team led by Nightwing and coerce them into helping invade Oolong Island. A team of operatives from both groups reaches the island, but Sasha Bordeaux and Captain Boomerang are taken captive by Chang Tzu, who subjects them both to excruciatingly torturous studies in order to examine their own respective meta-abilities. Their teammates eventually free them and the group retreats, their mission a failure, with Chang Tzu still remaining at large. While studying her unique physiology consisting of human tissue and artificially intelligent nanotechnology, Chang Tzu takes a morbid interest in Bordeaux, remarking:

"Never in my wildest dreams... did I imagine I would meet a creature I pitied more than myself".

As revealed to Alan Scott by Thundermind, Chang Tzu and his Science Squad are members of the Great Ten that provide, among other things, the funds to operate the organization and the technology they use.

His name is unclear as it has been inconsistently presented; he is introduced as Chang Tzu, but is subsequently referred to as both Chung Zhu and Chung Tzu. It may be possible that he has multiple names; Chang himself explains that "Egg Fu" is one of his "Nine thousand and nine unmentionable names", and immediately kills a guard who laughs at his mention of it.

Chang Tzu reappeared in a short story published in Wonder Woman #600, where he is defeated by Wonder Woman, Power Girl, and Batgirl.

In the New 52, Egg Fu appears in Harley Quinn (vol. 2) Annual #1. In the comic, he is Edgar Fullerton Yeung, a giant egg scientist who is secretly experimenting on Poison Ivy at Arkham Asylum. However, he ends up reforming with the help of Harley Quinn and gets himself a job.

Egg Fu appears throughout the DC Rebirth iteration of the Harley Quinn series.

In other media

Video games
 Chang Tzu appears in DC Universe Online. He appears in the Oolong Island group combat alert where he is the final boss. Chang Tzu also appears in the new House of Legends location as a pet vendor.
 Chang Tzu appears as a playable character in Lego DC Super Villains.

Miscellaneous
 Egg Fu appears in issue #16 of the Batman: The Brave and the Bold comic book. In this continuity, he is a demonic entity known as Y'ggphu-Soggoth, and is summoned by Egghead to cause havoc only to end up fighting Batman and Wonder Woman.

See also
List of Wonder Woman enemies

References

Characters created by Robert Kanigher
Characters created by Ross Andru
Fictional secret agents and spies
DC Comics aliens
Fictional computers
DC Comics characters who can teleport
Comics characters introduced in 1965
Fictional mass murderers
Fictional Chinese people
DC Comics scientists
DC Comics supervillains
DC Comics male supervillains
Eggs in culture
Wonder Woman characters
Video game bosses